Kościesza (Strzegomia, Strzegomya) - is a Polish coat of arms used by szlachta families in the times of Kingdom of Poland and the Polish–Lithuanian Commonwealth.

History
According to a legend the Kościesza arms has been granted by King Bolesław II the Generous to a brave knight named Kościesza after the Battle of Snowsko in 1072.

Notable bearers
 Gniewosz z Dalewic (died 1406), knight, podkomorzy of Kraków, castellan of Sandomierz
 Gniewosz of Dalewice
 Melchior Pudłowski, poet, secretary of the King
 Szymon Szymonowic (Simon Simonides, Szymonowicz or Bendoński)
 Jan Karol Dolski
 Jan Karol Chodkiewicz (Chodkiewicz coat of arms)
 Józef Piłsudski (Piłsudski coat of arms)
 August Żaba
 Witold Gombrowicz
 Aleksander Kakowski
 August Kościesza-Żaba
 Chodźko family
 Witold Chodźko
 Aleksander Chodźko
 Leonard Chodźko
 Ludwik Chodźko
 Wojciech Wijuk Kojałowicz
 Roman Żaba, general
 Tadeusz Żaba, Marshall of the Radom Confederation
 Jan Kazimierz Żaba, Voivode of Minsk
 Maryla Wereszczakówna, lover of Adam Mickiewicz
 Piotr z Chrząstowa, Bishop of Przemysl
 Imisław Wroński, Bishop of Plock
 Michał Kosmowski, Bishop of Gniezno
 Szczepan Zambrzycki, member of the Great Sejm
 Ludomir Włodzimierz Kościesza Wolski, officer of the Armia Krajowa, Righteous Among the Nations
 Bohdan Stetkiewicz, castellan of Mscislaw 
 Stanisław Gabriel Kakowski, chorazy of Nowogrod
 Włodzimierz Józef Mężyński, officer of the Polish Legions in World War I
 Józef Nielubowicz-Tukalski, Orthodox Metropolitan of Kijow (Kyiv)
 Ron Jaworski, NFL Quarterback

Related coat of arms
 Chodkiewicz coat of arms (Kościesza odmieniony)
 Piłsudski coat of arms (Kościesza odmieniony)

Gallery

See also

Bibliography
 Herbarz polski, Tadeusz Gajl, Gdańsk 2007,

References

Polish coats of arms